Blobel is a German surname.  Notable people with the surname include:

 Brigitte Blobel (born 1942), German writer
 Paul Blobel (1894–1951), German Nazi war criminal, hanged for war crimes
 Günter Blobel (1936-2018), German American biologist and 1999 Nobel Prize laureate in Physiology

German-language surnames